Lawrenceburg is an unincorporated community in Lawrence County, in the U.S. state of Missouri.

History
A post office called Lawrenceburg was established in 1876, and remained in operation until 1914. The community took its name from Lawrence County.

References

Unincorporated communities in Lawrence County, Missouri
Unincorporated communities in Missouri